Delhi Mellei is a 2014 Indian Meitei language film directed by Ajit Ningthouja, produced by Bishoya Potshangbam and presented by Mixn Raj under the banner of Rajkumar Films. It stars Bala Hijam as the titular protagonist with Gurumayum Bonny in the lead roles. The story of the film was written by Mixn Raj and Maheiba Moirangcha. The shooting of the film was mainly done in Delhi.

The film was premiered at Shankar Lal Auditorium, University of Delhi North Campus, New Delhi, on 15 November 2014 and released at Bhagyachandra Open Air Theatre (BOAT), Imphal, Manipur, on 21 December 2014.

The film was also premiered at Physics Auditorium, Punjab University, Chandigarh, on 16 November 2014; St. Patricks Community Hall, Bengaluru on 26 January 2015; Andra Saraswatha Parisab Auditorium, Opposite Aditya Hospital, Hyderabad on 1 February 2015 and Maulana Abdul Kalam Azad Memorial Hall, German Bakery, Karegaon Park, Pune on 15 February 2015.
The full movie was officially released by TANTHA in YouTube on 29 June 2015.

Synopsis
The film is about a lady, Mellei (Bala) from Manipur, northeast India, who came to Delhi to pursue her studies in Ramjas College, Delhi University but returned empty-handed when she went on a wrong path and wasn't able to tackle the situations and events happening around her with a positive energy.

Cast
 Gurumayum Bonny as Tomthin
 Bala Hijam as Mellei
 Ratan Lai as Gunanu, Tomthin's roommate
 Christy Moirangthem as Sanatombi
 Takhellambam Lokendra as Mellei's father
 Heisnam Geeta as Mellei's mother
 Anu Sagolshem
 Raj Baduria
 Rohen
 Shila
 Telheiba

Soundtrack
Poirei Thokchom and Boy Soraisham composed the soundtrack for the film and Mixn Raj and Maheiba Moirangcha wrote the lyrics. The songs are titled Eigi Delhi Mellei and Lottuna Thamladara.

References

2010s Meitei-language films
Films shot in Delhi
2014 films